Vacant Possession may refer to:

 Vacant possession, legal term
 Vacant Possession (film), 1995 film
 Vacant Possession (novel), 1986 novel